The 2004 season was Molde's 29th season in the top flight of Norwegian football. In Tippeligaen they finished in 11th position.

Molde participated in the Norwegian Cup. On 9 June 2004, Molde was defeated 1–2 by Vard Haugesund in the third round.

Squad

As of end of season.

Transfers

In

Out

Loans in

Loans out

Competitions

Tippeligaen

Results summary

Results by round

Results

League table

Norwegian Cup

Squad statistics

Appearances and goals

|-
|colspan="14"|Players away from Molde on loan:

|-
|colspan="14"|Players who left Molde during the season:

|}

Goal Scorers

See also
Molde FK seasons

References

External links
nifs.no

2004
Molde